Power level may refer to:
Level (logarithmic quantity), logarithm of the ratio of the value of some quantity to a reference value of the same quantity.
Sound power level
The act of power-leveling in video games.
The numerical rating of a character's strength and fighting ability in the Dragon Ball franchise, as in the quote and meme "It's Over 9000!"
A way to measure the power of a character through feats of strength.
The power level of the ocean distribution (The potential exists to develop up to 80,000 terawatt-hours electricity per year (TWh/y), generated by changes in ocean temperatures, salt content, movements of tides, currents and waves swells)

See also
Energy level, allowable discrete values of energy of a bound quantum mechanical system or particle
Power, root-power, and field quantities, level vs. power measurement units
Power rating, highest power input allowed to flow through particular equipment